The 2005 Mid-American Conference baseball tournament took place in May 2005. The top six regular season finishers met in the double-elimination tournament held at Stanley G. McKie Field at Joseph P. Hayden Jr. Park on the campus of Miami University in Oxford, Ohio. This was the seventeenth Mid-American Conference postseason tournament to determine a champion. Top seed  won their third tournament championship to earn the conference's automatic bid to the 2005 NCAA Division I baseball tournament.

Seeding and format 
The winner of each division claimed the top two seeds, while the next four finishers based on conference winning percentage only, regardless of division, participated in the tournament. The teams played double-elimination tournament. This was the eighth year of the six team tournament.

Results 

* - Indicates game required 11 innings.

All-Tournament Team 
The following players were named to the All-Tournament Team.

Most Valuable Player 
Paul Frietch was named Tournament Most Valuable Player. Frietch played for Miami.

References 

Tournament
Mid-American Conference Baseball Tournament
Mid-American Conference baseball tournament
Mid-American Conference baseball tournament